MS  A Nepita is a fast ropax ferry for Corsica Linea. The ferry was refurbished in Gdańsk, Poland for her new service and was returned to her original design before her SeaFrance career and looks identical to her sisters Stena Superfast VII & VIII. Before November 2014 she operated between Dover and Calais for DFDS Seaways France and between 2008 and 2012 for SeaFrance.

Concept and construction
A Nepita was the last ship in a series of four identical ice classed fast ferries built by HDW for Superfast Ferries' new Baltic Sea services. She was launched on 18 November 2000, on the same date as her sisters Superfast VII and Superfast IX Stena Superfast X was delivered to her owners on 26 February 2002 and christened on the same date by Patricia Lederer, wife of the HDW project director for the Superfast ships.

Service history
Superfast X entered service for Superfast Ferries on 27 February 2002 on the Hanko–Rostock route. She remained on that route until 19 April 2002, when she was laid up in Kiel at HDW. On 17 May 2002, she re-entered service, on the Rosyth–Zeebrugge route. In January and February 2004, Superfast X was rebuilt at Fosen Mekaniske Verksted, Fosen, Norway with additional passenger berths. On 7 August 2006, Superfast Ferries announced it had sold Superfast X to Veolia Transport for €112 million. The ship was delivered to her new owners on 12 February 2007 and renamed Jean Nicoli.

In March 2007, Jean Nicoli made crossings from Le Havre to Marseille, carrying cars on board. During April the same year, she was chartered to COTUNAV for traffic from Italy and France to Tunisia. At the end of April she was laid up, initially at La Seyne, later at Marseille. From 8 September until 2 October 2007 she was chartered to ANEK Lines for service on its Patras–Corfu–Igoumenitsa–Venice route. On 27 December 2007, the ship was sold to SeaFrance.

In the beginning of April 2008, Jean Nicoli was delivered to SeaFrance and renamed SeaFrance Molière. On 3 April 2008, she left Marseille for Arno Dunkerque for rebuilding into a short distance ferry. After transfer to the leasing company Sarl Poquelin Bail, she entered service with SeaFrance in freight only operation on 19 August 2008 and began passenger service on 1 September 2008.

Due to the commercial court ordering that Seafrance be liquidated, from 16 November 2011 the ship was laid up, initially at Dunkerque and then, following its sale to Scapino Shipping Ltd, at Tilbury in England.

In October 2012, DFDS chartered the ship to be used on its Dover–Dunkerque crossing. During a short refit by Arno at Dunkerque she was renamed Dieppe Seaways and returned to the French registry. She re-entered service on 7 November though, following a change of plan, on the Dover-Calais route.

On 1 May 2014, Dieppe Seaways suffered a fire from an overheated boiler in the engine room as she approached Dover from Calais. All 316 passengers disembarked safely on arrival. However, in responding to the fire, seven crew members and three firefighters were injured with flash burns.

At the end of her charter to DFDS Seaways in November 2014, Stena Line took possession of the vessel returning her to her original name, albeit with a Stena prefix, and sending her for an extensive refit to return the cargo arrangements to their original configuration and refurbish the interiors similar to sisterships Stena Superfast VII and Stena Superfast VIII operating on the Cairnryan (Loch Ryan) to Belfast route. After refit the ship replaced MS Stena Nordica (which itself is being chartered to DFDS Seaways to take up the timetable Stena Superfast X previous operated) on the Holyhead–Dublin Port route on 9 March 2015. Stena Superfast X substantially increased the freight and passenger capacity on the route and coincided with the withdrawal of the Stena HSS service to Dún Laoghaire. In January 2020 Stena line announced that Stena Superfast X chartered to Corsica Linea and will be renamed A Nepita to her new owners which will be delivered in March 2020. It will be serviced for new ownership in Piraeus, Greece, and will have maintenance for new service in Greece (+100 cabins and maybe scrubbers).

References

Ships built in Kiel
Ferries of France
2001 ships
10
Ships of the Stena Line